Thomas Doodputlee McMeekin (31 December 1866 – 24 October 1946) was a British sailor and Olympic Champion. He competed at the 1908 Summer Olympics in London and won a silver medal in the 6 metre class. The gold medal was won by his helmsman G.U.Laws, who had also designed the boat (Dormy).

References

1866 births
1946 deaths
British male sailors (sport)
Sailors at the 1908 Summer Olympics – 6 Metre
Olympic sailors of Great Britain
Olympic gold medallists for Great Britain
Olympic medalists in sailing
Medalists at the 1908 Summer Olympics